American singer-songwriter and actor Kris Kristofferson has been in numerous films, television films, television series and video games. He started acting in the 1970s, appearing in the films The Last Movie (1971), Cisco Pike (1972), Pat Garrett and Billy the Kid (1973), Blume in Love (1973), Alice Doesn't Live Here Anymore (1974), Bring Me the Head of Alfredo Garcia (1974) and Vigilante Force (1976), before starring in the 1976 film A Star Is Born as John Norman Howard, which earned him a Golden Globe Award for Best Actor - Motion Picture Musical or Comedy. He went on to co-star in Stagecoach (1986) and star in films such as Semi-Tough (1977), Convoy (1978), Heaven's Gate (1980), Flashpoint (1984), Big Top Pee-wee (1988), and Welcome Home (1989).

In the 1990s, Kristofferson played Gabriel in the 1993 film Knights with Lance Henriksen and as Charlie Wade in the 1996 film Lone Star with Matthew McConaughey. He was then cast as Abraham Whistler in the 1998 vampire superhero action film Blade, a role he later reprised in Blade II (2002) and Blade: Trinity (2004) and which has been criticised as whitewashing. During that time, he also portrayed Karubi (Daena's father) in Planet of the Apes (2001), and Older Billy Coleman Where the Red Fern Grows (2003). In 2005, he appeared in The Jacket with Adrien Brody, a year later he was in Fast Food Nation with Patricia Arquette and lent his voice as the narrator to the 2007 film I'm Not There. He joined the ensemble cast in the 2009 romantic comedy He's Just Not That Into You alongside Jennifer Aniston. He played Reed Haskett in the 2011 film Dolphin Tale and again in the sequel, Dolphin Tale 2 (2014).

Kristofferson's television work includes the television films Freedom Road (1979), and Blood & Orchids (1986); the miniseries Amerika (1987) and Lives of the Saints (2004); the television series Dead Man's Gun (1997–1999); and most recently, playing the role of U.S. President Andrew Jackson in the historical miniseries Texas Rising (2015).

Film

Television

Video games

See also
Kris Kristofferson discography

References

External links
 
 

Male actor filmographies
American filmographies